Aria on the Bay is a high-rise condominium in the Arts & Entertainment District/Edgewater neighborhood at 1770 North Bayshore Drive,  Miami, Florida, U.S.A. Overlooking Margaret Pace Park and Biscayne Bay in Miami's Arts & Entertainment District. The 52-story building has over 648 units ranging from 813 to 2365 sq ft as well as commercial space. Aria on the Bay was developed by Melo Group and  designed by Arquitectonica who handled the architecture, interior design and landscape.

See also
 List of tallest buildings in Miami
 List of tallest buildings in Florida

References

External links
 https://web.archive.org/web/20150722210904/http://ariamiami.com/wp-content/uploads/2015/05/JOHN-ARIA-Fact-Sheet-English.pdf

Residential condominiums in Miami
Residential skyscrapers in Miami
2018 establishments in Florida
Residential buildings completed in 2018